Cydia pactolana, the spruce bark tortrix, is a moth of the  family Tortricidae. It is found in central, northern and eastern Europe as well as Siberia. In Japan, the subspecies Cydia pactolana yasudai is present.

The wingspan is 13–14 mm. Adults are on wing from May to June in one generation depending on the location.

The larvae feed on Picea abies, Picea pungens, Picea sitchensis and Larix species. Cydia pactolana yasudai feeds on Abies sachalinensis.

In Finland, spruce bark tortrix was found to cause damage to Picea abies in association with the fungal pathogen Neonectria fuckeliana.

Subspecies
Cydia pactolana pactolana 
Cydia pactolana yasudai (Japan)

References

External links
 Arthropods of Economic Importance

Grapholitini
Moths of Japan
Moths of Europe